Matapa is a genus of grass skipper butterflies in the family Hesperiidae.
 
The species are mainly crepuscular and have red eyes, at least during their life.

Species
Matapa aria (Moore, [1866])
Matapa celsina (C. & R. Felder, [1867]) Celebes, Banggai Island
Matapa cresta Evans, 1949 Sikkim to Burma, China, Andamans, Thailand, Laos, Malaya, Borneo, Sumatra
Matapa deprivata de Jong, 1983 Burma
Matapa druna (Moore, [1866])
Matapa intermedia de Jong, 1983 Sulawesi
Matapa pseudodruna  X.L. Fan, H. Chiba & M. Wang  China
Matapa purpurascens Elwes & Edwards, 1897 Khasi Hills (Assam), China
Matapa sasivarna (Moore, [1866]) Sikkim to Burma, Thailand, Laos, Hainan, Malaya, Sumatra

Biology 
The larvae feed on Gramineae including Bambusa, Dendrocalamus, Dinochloa, Gigantochloa, Ochlandra, and Oxytenanthera.

References

  1983: Revision of the Oriental genus Matapa Moore (Lepidoptera, Hesperiidae) with discussion of its phylogeny and geographic History. Zoologische Mededelingen 57 (21): 243-270. Full article:

External links
Images representing Matapa at bold

Erionotini
Hesperiidae genera